Down the Road may refer to:

 Down the Road (Larry Stewart album), 1993
 Down the Road (Manassas album), or the title song, 1973
 Down the Road (Van Morrison album), or the title song, 2002
 "Down the Road" (C2C song), 2012
 "Down the Road" (Mac McAnally song), 1990, also covered by Kenny Chesney with McAnally (2008)
 "Down the Road", a song by Lester Flatt and Earl Scruggs, 1949
 "Down the Road", a song by Kansas from the 1975 album Song for America
 "Down the Road", a song by Stan Rogers from the 1999 album From Coffee House to Concert Hall
 Down the Road Saloon, formerly Beck's Run School, a historical building in Pittsburgh, Pennsylvania, U.S.

See also